Alexia Djilali (born ) is a French female former volleyball player, playing as an opposite. She was part of the France women's national volleyball team.

She competed at the 2013 Women's European Volleyball Championship. On club level she played for ASPTT Mulhouse in 2013.

References

External links

1987 births
Living people
Sportspeople from Mulhouse
French women's volleyball players
Place of birth missing (living people)